Alfred George Elliott (1828–1915) was Bishop of Kilmore, Elphin and Ardagh from 1897 to 1915.

Educated at Trinity College Dublin, he was ordained in 1858 and his first post a curacy at Bailieborough. He later held Incumbencies at Muntoconnaught, Castleraghan and Drumlease before appointment to the episcopate as the eighth Bishop of the United Diocese.

References

1828 births
1915 deaths
Alumni of Trinity College Dublin
19th-century Anglican bishops in Ireland
20th-century Anglican bishops in Ireland
Bishops of Kilmore, Elphin and Ardagh